USS Matanikau (CVE-101) was a  of the United States Navy. She was named after the Actions along the Matanikau, a series of engagements during the Guadalcanal campaign. Built for service during World War II, the ship was launched in May 1944, and commissioned in June, and served as a training and transport carrier. Notably, some 1,332 aviators earned their qualifications on-board the carrier. Postwar, she participated in Operation Magic Carpet. She was decommissioned in October 1946, when she was mothballed in the Pacific Reserve Fleet. Ultimately, she was sold for scrapping in July 1960.

Design and description

Matanikau was a Casablanca-class escort carrier, the most numerous type of aircraft carriers ever built, and designed specifically to be mass-produced using prefabricated sections, in order to replace heavy war losses in the early engagements of the Pacific War. She displaced  standard,  with a full load. She was powered with two Skinner Unaflow reciprocating steam engines, which drove two shafts, providing , thus enabling her to make . Her compact size necessitated the installment of an aircraft catapult at her bow, and there were two aircraft elevators to facilitate movement of aircraft between the flight and hangar deck: one each fore and aft.

One /38 caliber dual-purpose gun was mounted on the stern. Anti-aircraft defense was provided by 8 Bofors  anti-aircraft guns in single mounts, as well as 12 Oerlikon  cannons, which were mounted around the perimeter of the deck. By the end of the war, Casablanca-class carriers had been modified to carry thirty 20-mm cannons, and the amount of 40-mm guns had been doubled to sixteen, by putting them into twin mounts. These modifications were in response to increasing casualties due to kamikaze attacks. Casablanca-class escort carriers were designed to carry 27 aircraft, but the hangar deck could accommodate more.

Construction
Her construction was awarded to Kaiser Shipbuilding Company, Vancouver, Washington under a Maritime Commission contract, on 18 June 1942, under the name Dolomi Bay, as part of a tradition which named escort carriers after bays or sounds in Alaska. The escort carrier was laid down on 10 March 1944, MC hull 1138, the forty-seventh of a series of fifty Casablanca-class escort carriers. She therefore received the classification symbol CVE-101. On 26 April 1944, she was renamed Matanikau, as part of a new naval policy which named subsequent Casablanca-class carriers after naval or land engagements. She was named after the Actions along the Matanikau, a series of engagements conducted as part of the larger Guadalcanal campaign. She was launched on 22 May 1944; sponsored by Mrs. Margaret Anna McLaren Grant, the wife of United States Representative Robert A. Grant; transferred to the United States Navy and commissioned on 24 June 1944, with Captain William Lawrence Erdmann in command.

Service history

World War II

Upon being commissioned, Matanikau underwent a shakedown cruise down the West Coast to San Diego, arriving on 25 July. She then underwent a transport mission, taking on 191 passengers and 56 aircraft. She departed on 1 August, bound for the South Pacific. She stopped at Espiritu Santo and Finschhafen, before arriving at Manus Island on 23 August. There, she discharged the rest of her cargo, and took on a load of 112 passengers and 41 damaged aircraft, ferrying them back to the West Coast. She arrived back at San Diego on 19 September. This transport mission would be the farthest west that she would ever sail during the course of the war. On 14 August, she took on Composite Squadron 93 (VC-93), and began pilot qualifications, serving as a training carrier off the California coast. She continued these duties for eight months, qualifying an impressive amount of aviators. Between January and June 1945, 1,332 pilots earned their qualifications onboard Matanikau, and 12,762 landings were conducted on her flight deck during this period. For example, on 25 May 1945, Marine Torpedo Bombing Squadrons 454 and 321 (CVS-454 and CVS-321) made 602 landings throughout the day. During her period as a training carrier, Captain Francis Benedict Johnson took over command of the vessel, a position that he would hold for the rest of the war.

She finished her duties as a training carrier, and departed San Diego on 28 July, yet again as a transport carrier, with 158 personnel and 68 aircraft being transported to the Marshall Islands. She arrived at Roi-Namur on 10 August, where she unloaded her cargo. She then reported to Pearl Harbor on 16 August. Whilst in Hawaii, news of the Japanese surrender broke. On 31 August, she departed Pearl Harbor, bound for the West Pacific, where she would support U.S. forces in their Occupation of Japan. She was assigned to the Ninth Fleet, and arrived at Ōminato Guard District on 11 September. She operated off the west coast of Japan, covering landings by U.S. forces, including the Eighth Army at Aomori on 25 September. Following the landings, she steamed south, and departed Tokyo Bay on 30 September, making stops at Guam and Pearl Harbor, before arriving back at San Francisco on 23 October.

At San Francisco, she joined the Operation Magic Carpet fleet, which repatriated U.S. servicemen from around the Pacific. She left the West Coast on 3 November, and steamed for Saipan, where she embarked more than a thousand personnel. She returned to California on 19 November, before making another run to the Marshalls between 21 November and 5 December. On 11 December, she once again departed, this time for the Marianas Islands, and as part of an operation independent of Operation Magic Carpet. She arrived at Guam on 27 December, where she took on a load of 795 troops of the 3rd Marine Division, and dropped them off at the Taku Forts, near Tianjin. There, the marines served in an advisory role, supporting the Kuomintang Republic of China in the Chinese Civil War.

She left for the United States on 9 January 1946, and returned to port in San Diego on 29 January. She departed for Tacoma, Washington on 1 February, arriving on the 5th for inactivation. There, she was moored for the next eight months, before being decommissioned on 11 October. She was mothballed as part of the Pacific Reserve Fleet, and she was reclassified as an escort helicopter aircraft carrier, CVHE-101 on 15 June 1955. She was reclassified as an aircraft ferry with the designation of AKV-36  on 7 May 1959. She was struck from the Navy list on 1 April 1960 and she was sold on 27 July 1960 to Jacq. Pierot, Jr. & Sons, New York for scrapping.

References

Sources

Online sources

Bibliography

External links 

 

 

Casablanca-class escort carriers
World War II escort aircraft carriers of the United States
Ships built in Vancouver, Washington
1944 ships
S4-S2-BB3 ships